Maulana Ghulam Mohammad Sadiq was a Pakistani Islamic scholar and former member of the National Assembly of Pakistan.

References

2021 deaths
Pakistani Islamic religious leaders
Pakistani MNAs 2002–2007
Jamiat Ulema-e-Islam (F) politicians
People from Charsadda District, Pakistan
Pakistani Sunni Muslim scholars of Islam
Deobandis